Bolma aureola, common name the golden turbo shell or the scaly star shell, is a species of sea snail, a marine gastropod mollusk in the family Turbinidae, the turban snails.

Description
(Original description by Ch. Hedley) The size of the shell varies between 60 mm and 100 mm. The large, massive, imperforate shell has a conical shape and contains seven whorls. The spire is elevate, later whorls becoming subscalar. The colour is a uniform dull brick-red, except a brilliant cadmium-orange ring round the aperture. The sculpture : the earlier whorls are strongly radiately plicate below the sutures. The periphery is armed with short, broad, downwardly directed spines becoming obsolete towards the aperture. On the penultimate whorl they number sixteen. Close spiral cords densely beset with imbricating scales cover the surface of the shell. Above there are ten cords carrying more distant hooded scales obliquely connected with those above and below. On the base there are also ten cords with more crowded scales. The base of the shell is flattened. The aperture is very oblique, subcircular, within and upon the columella pearly. A narrow inner margin to the lip continuous with an axial callus pad is bright cadmium-orange. The operculum is pale orange, oblong. Its nucleus is subterminal, hollow medially between two ribs, one of which rises proximally into a heavy callus mound.

The subscalar whorls, peripheral thorns and orange mouth of Bolma. aureolum distinguish it.

Distribution
This marine species is endemic to Australia and occurs off New South Wales and Queensland.

References

 Iredale, T. & McMichael, D.F. 1962. A reference list of the marine Mollusca of New South Wales. Memoirs of the Australian Museum 11: 1-109
 Wilson, B. 1993. Australian Marine Shells. Prosobranch Gastropods. Kallaroo, Western Australia : Odyssey Publishing Vol. 1 408 pp.

External links
 To Encyclopedia of Life
 To World Register of Marine Species
 

aureola
Gastropods of Australia
Gastropods described in 1907